Fantasy Masters' Screen is a 1981 fantasy role-playing game supplement for The Fantasy Trip published by Metagaming Concepts.

Contents
Fantasy Masters' Screen contains, on the GM's side, all the important tables and information necessary to referee a session of The Fantasy Trip.

Fantasy Master's Screen is a GM's screen.

Publication history
Fantasy Master's Screen was published by Metagaming, in 1981 as a cardstock screen.

Reception
William A. Barton reviewed Fantasy Masters' Screen in The Space Gamer No. 41. Barton commented that "Regardless of what errors did creep in, the Fantasy Masters' Screen is an item no TFT GM should overlook. Pick it up and never again will you be forced to use an old notebook or (for shame!) a D&D shield in your Labyrinth sessions."

References

Fantasy role-playing game supplements
Gamemaster's screens
Role-playing game supplements introduced in 1981